Florent Payet (born 21 November 1986) is a French downhill mountain biker. In 2016, he finished third at the UCI Downhill World Championships in Val di Sole, Italy.

Major results

2004
 1st  European Junior Downhill Championships
 2nd  UCI Junior Downhill World Championships
 3nd National Downhill Championships
2007
 3rd  European Downhill Championships
2008
 1st  European Downhill Championships
 3rd National Downhill Championships
2013
 3rd National Downhill Championships
2016
 3rd  UCI Downhill World Championships
 3rd National Downhill Championships
2017
 1st  European Downhill Championships

References

External links

Living people
Downhill mountain bikers
1986 births
French male cyclists
Sportspeople from Saint-Denis, Réunion
French mountain bikers